Charles Denton may refer to:

Charles Denton (television and film producer) (born 1937), English production executive
 Charles Ashpitel Denton (1852–1932), appeared in 1877 and 1878 FA Cup Finals

See also
Denton (disambiguation)